William Milroy (born 11 September 1980) is a professional badminton player. A resident of Edmonton, Alberta, he has been a Men's Doubles Winner in the Canadian National Badminton Championships in each year since 2004.

References

1980 births
Living people
Sportspeople from Edmonton
Badminton players at the 2007 Pan American Games
Canadian male badminton players
Pan American Games medalists in badminton
Pan American Games gold medalists for Canada
Commonwealth Games competitors for Canada
Badminton players at the 2006 Commonwealth Games
Badminton players at the 2002 Commonwealth Games
Medalists at the 2007 Pan American Games